The International Federation for Information and Documentation (FID) was an international organization that was created to promote universal access to all recorded knowledge through the creation of an international classification system. FID stands for the original French Fédération internationale de documentation.

Historical Background of FID 

FID was established on 12 September 1895, in Brussels, as the International Institute of Bibliography (originally Institut International de Bibliographie, or IIB) by two Belgian lawyers, Paul Otlet (1868–1944) and Henri La Fontaine (1854–1943). It was popularly known as the Brussels Institute. Its headquarters was changed to The Hague after 1934. It had gone through a number of changes in name that reflect changes of conceptualization of the field in which it operates.

The changes in names and years are :
1931 – The International Institute for Documentation (Institut International de Documentation, IID)
1937 – The International Federation for Documentation (Fédération Internationale de Documentation, FID)
1988 – The International Federation for Information and Documentation (Fédération Internationale d'Information et de Documentation, FID)

The Institute was one of the sponsors of the first World Congress of Universal Documentation, held in Paris in 1937. FID was dissolved in 2002.

Publications 
One of the publications of FID was FID Communications.

References 

W. Boyd Rayward
Michael Buckland
Keenan, S. (2003). FID (Federation Internationale de Documentation). In International Encyclopedia of Information and Library Science. 2nd ed. Ed. by John Feather & Paul Sturges. , London: Routledge (pp. 196–198)

Organizations established in 1895
Organizations disestablished in 2002
Non-profit organisations based in Belgium
History organisations based in the Netherlands
Organisations based in The Hague
Archivist associations
1895 establishments in Belgium